Alain Ayissi (born 15 April 1962) is a Cameroonian former cyclist. He competed in the individual road race and the team time trial events at the 1984 Summer Olympics.

References

1962 births
Living people
Cameroonian male cyclists
Olympic cyclists of Cameroon
Cyclists at the 1984 Summer Olympics
Place of birth missing (living people)